Wiganda Pradika (born 3 December 1991) is an Indonesian professional footballer who plays as a right-back for Liga 2 club Semen Padang.

Club career

Badak Lampung
He was signed for Badak Lampung to play in Liga 2 in the 2020 season. This season was suspended on 27 March 2020 due to the COVID-19 pandemic. The season was abandoned and was declared void on 20 January 2021.

Semen Padang
Wiganda was signed for Semen Padang to play in Liga 2 in the 2022–23 season. He made his league debut on 29 August 2022 in a match against PSPS Riau at the Riau Main Stadium, Riau.

References

External links
 Wiganda Pradika at Soccerway
 Wiganda Pradika at Liga Indonesia

1991 births
Living people
Indonesian footballers
Liga 1 (Indonesia) players
Liga 2 (Indonesia) players
Badak Lampung F.C. players
Mitra Kukar players
PSMS Medan players
Sportspeople from Medan
Association football defenders